Desensitization can refer to:
 Desensitization (telecommunications)
 Desensitization (medicine)
 Desensitization (psychology)
 Desensitization of explosives, see Phlegmatized
 Desensitization, Allergen immunotherapy
 Desensitization, another name for Exposure therapy